The 2000–01 season was Blackpool F.C.'s 93rd season (90th consecutive) in the Football League. They competed in the 24-team Division Three, then the bottom tier of English league football, finishing seventh. They won the end-of-season play-offs and were promoted back to Division Two after a season's absence.

John Murphy was the club's top scorer for the second consecutive season, with 23 goals (eighteen in the league, one in the FA Cup and four in the League Cup).

Table

References

Blackpool F.C. seasons
Blackpool F.C.